Mengzhuang is a metro station of Zhengzhou Metro Chengjiao line.

Although having the same name, this station is not close to the Mengzhuang railway station on Zhengzhou-Xinzheng Airport intercity railway and these two stations are not interchangeable.

Station layout  
The station has two island platforms (four platform sides) and four tracks. The Platform 1 and 4 (southernmost and northernmost platforms) are for regular Chengjiao line services, while the Platform 2 and 3 are for back-to-depot or out-of-depot trains going to or from Mengzhuang depot. In rush hours on weekdays, platform 2 and 3 are also open for trains terminated at this station.

Exits

References 

Stations of Zhengzhou Metro
Chengjiao line, Zhengzhou Metro
Railway stations in China opened in 2017